Edgar Jorek (born 2 December 1955) is a German gymnast. He competed in eight events at the 1976 Summer Olympics.

References

External links
 

1955 births
Living people
German male artistic gymnasts
Olympic gymnasts of West Germany
Gymnasts at the 1976 Summer Olympics
People from Wolfsburg
Sportspeople from Lower Saxony